The 435 m high Königsberg is a hill in the Harz mountains in central Germany, southwest of Goslar between the Grane Reservoir and the Steinberg. On its summit are the ruins of an old tuberculosis convalescent home, later a children's home, the Königsberg Sanatorium.

Hills of the Harz
Goslar
Hills of Lower Saxony